Csaba Spandler (born 7 March 1996) is a Hungarian professional footballer who plays as a defender for Puskás Akadémia FC.

International career
Spandler was called up by the senior Hungary team for the Nations League matches against England (home), Italy (away), Germany (home) and England (away) on 4, 7, 11 and 14 June 2022 respectively.

Career statistics

Updated to games played as of 15 May 2021.

References

External links
MLSZ 

1996 births
Living people
People from Mór
Hungarian people of German descent
Hungarian footballers
Association football defenders
Hungary youth international footballers
Puskás Akadémia FC players
Csákvári TK players
Nemzeti Bajnokság I players
Sportspeople from Fejér County